Marulaneng is a village in the Sekhukhune District Municipality in the Limpopo Province, South Africa.  Marulaneng falls within the administrative boundaries of the Makhuduthamaga Local Municipality.

Jane Furse is the nearest major economic centre for Marulaneng along with several villages such as Ga-Molepane, Ga-Moretsele, Madibong, Mamone, Marulaneng, Mokwete and Riverside, Glen Cowie.

Government 

Marulaneng is under the authority of traditional leader, known as Kgoši Seraki Thulare whose father and former chief is Kgoši Phetedi Thulare.

It should however be acknowledged that there is rivalry between Seraki and his uncle, Sekwati younger brother to Phetedi over the chieftaincy.

The argument is that no candle wife was ever married during Phetedi'd reign to give birth to a legitimate heir.

The argument continues that even the Phetedi's first born, the late Motodi the senior brother to Seraki who was killed in the early 1990s was not the legitimate heir.

Culture 

The media serving the area are Sekhukhune Community Radio, Thobela FM, the Polokwane-based South African Broadcasting Corporation (SABC) radio station and Capricorn FM, a commercial radio station also based in Polokwane.

Sepedi is the mainly spoken in Marulaneng.  Other languages also spoken here, although by a minority of residents, include Tsonga and Swati.

Education 

Only two schools are positioned in Marulaneng.

 Thulare Primary School
 Mpilo Secondary School

Populated places in the Makhuduthamaga Local Municipality